Alexander Varfolomeev (Russian: Александр Георгиевич Варфоломеев; born 4 June 1965) is a Russian politician serving as a senator from the Buryat Autonomous Soviet Socialist Republic since 19 September 2018.

Varfolomeev is under personal sanctions introduced by the European Union, the United Kingdom, the USA, Canada, Switzerland, Australia, Ukraine, New Zealand, for ratifying the decisions of the "Treaty of Friendship, Cooperation and Mutual Assistance between the Russian Federation and the Donetsk People's Republic and between the Russian Federation and the Luhansk People's Republic" and providing political and economic support for Russia's annexation of Ukrainian territories.

Biography

Alexander Varfolomeev was born on 4 June 1965. In 1987, he graduated from the Irkutsk State University. In 2000, he also received a degree from the East Siberia State University of Technology and Management. After that, he worked as a journalist in Mukhorshibir. He was also a member of the Communist Party of the Soviet Union.

From 1988 to 1991, he was the first secretary of the Mukhorshibir district committee of the Komsomol. In 1994, Varfolomeev started working as an assistant to the senator from the People's Khural of the Republic of Buryatia Lidya Nimaeva. Later he was appointed as a deputy head of the first president of Buryatia Leonid Potapov. From 1998 to 2013, he served as a deputy of the People's Khural of the Republic of Buryatia. Since 18 September 2013, he has served as a Senator from the People's Khural of the Republic of Buryatia. Varfolomeev was re-elected in September 2018.

References

Living people
1965 births
United Russia politicians
21st-century Russian politicians
Members of the Federation Council of Russia (after 2000)